Bourbon is a town in Bourbon Township, Marshall County, Indiana, United States. The population was 1,698 at the 2020 census.

History
The town of Bourbon was laid out in 1853 when it was certain the railroad would be extended to that point. It took its name from Bourbon Township, which was named after Bourbon County, Kentucky, the former home of many of the early settlers.

The Bourbon Community Building-Gymnasium was listed on the National Register of Historic Places in 2015.

Geography

Bourbon is located at  (41.297815, -86.116921).

Demographics

2020 census
As of the census of 2020, there were 1,698 people, 678 households, and 465 families living in the town. The racial makeup of the town was 96.7% White, 0.3% African American, 0.1% Native American, 0.6% Asian, 1.2% from other races, and 1.0% from two or more races. Hispanic or Latino of any race were 5.0% of the population.

There were 678 households, of which 38.8% had children under the age of 18 living with them, 49.1% were married couples living together, 14.5% had a female householder with no husband present, 5.0% had a male householder with no wife present, and 31.4% were non-families. 26.8% of all households were made up of individuals, and 10% had someone living alone who was 65 years of age or older. The average household size was 2.67 and the average family size was 3.25.

The median age in the town was 32.7 years. 30.8% of residents were under the age of 18; 8% were between the ages of 18 and 24; 26.6% were from 25 to 44; 23.8% were from 45 to 64; and 10.9% were 65 years of age or older. The gender makeup of the town was 48.6% male and 51.4% female.

2000 census
As of the census of 2000, there were 1,691 people, 646 households, and 443 families living in the town. The racial makeup of the town was 96.16% White, 0.06% African American, 0.24% Native American, 0.59% Asian, 0.18% Pacific Islander, 2.37% from other races, and 0.41% from two or more races. Hispanic or Latino of any race were 5.03% of the population.

There were 646 households, out of which 38.1% had children under the age of 18 living with them, 54.8% were married couples living together, 9.4% had a female householder with no husband present, and 31.4% were non-families. 28.6% of all households were made up of individuals, and 12.2% had someone living alone who was 65 years of age or older. The average household size was 2.62 and the average family size was 3.26.

In the town, the population was spread out, with 31.3% under the age of 18, 9.5% from 18 to 24, 31.3% from 25 to 44, 16.2% from 45 to 64, and 11.7% who were 65 years of age or older. The median age was 32 years. For every 100 females, there were 92.8 males. For every 100 females age 18 and over, there were 89.6 males.

The median income for a household in the town was $40,292, and the median income for a family was $50,000. Males had a median income of $32,679 versus $21,645 for females. The per capita income for the town was $17,054. About 4.1% of families and 5.9% of the population were below the poverty line, including 8.0% of those under age 18 and 8.4% of those age 65 or over.

Education
The town has a lending library, the Bourbon Public Library.

Triton School Corporation is headquartered in Bourbon, along with Triton Elementary and Jr./Sr. high schools, encompassing grades kindergarten through 12.

Bourbon Christian School is located on the north end of the town and encompasses grades 1 through 12.

See also
 Isaac and Ruth Arnold House
 Bourbon Commercial Historic District
 Bourbon Community Building-Gymnasium
 Bourbon Residential Historic District

References

External links

 Town of Bourbon

Towns in Marshall County, Indiana
Towns in Indiana